Philippe Jules François Mancini, 9th Duke of Nevers (Paris, 1676 – Paris, 1768) was a French aristocrat and member of the Mancini family.

Early life
He was born as the son of Philippe Jules Mancini, 8th Duke of Nevers and Diane Gabrielle Damas de Thianges (1656-1715), he was the great-nephew of both King Louis XIV of France's mistress, Madame de Montespan, and his first chief minister, Cardinal Mazarin.

Marriage and issue
In 1709 he married Maria Anna Spinola di Vergano (1678-1718), daughter of Juan Bautista Spinola
Marchese di Vergagna and Marie Françoise du Bois de Lezinnes. Their only child was the academician Louis-Jules Mancini-Mazarini, the final Duke de Nevers.

Titles
He could not inherit the title of duc de Nevers from his father in 1707, because the duchy had not been properly registered at the Parlement de Paris. In 1709, he inherited the titles of prince de Vergagne, grandee of Spain and Prince of the Holy Roman Empire from his father-in-law. In 1720 he received letters of confirmation for the duchy of Nevers from the Parlement.  In 1730, he abdicated as duke in his son's favour.

1676 births
1768 deaths
Dukes of Nivernais
Grandees of Spain
Princes of the Holy Roman Empire
18th-century peers of France
17th-century people of the Holy Roman Empire
18th-century people of the Holy Roman Empire
Dukes of Nevers